Epacternis flavimedialis is a species of snout moth in the genus Epacternis. It was described by George Hampson in 1906 and is known from Angola, Benin, the Central African Republic, Ivory Coast, Ethiopia and Nigeria.

References

Moths described in 1906
Pyralinae